Charles H. Jordan (7 February 1908 – 16–20 August 1967) was an American Jewish humanitarian. He worked for the American Jewish Joint Distribution Committee from 1941, becoming its executive vice president from 1965 until his death in 1967.

Jordan was born in the United States, moved to Germany as a child, fled Germany for Prague after a Nazi attack before returning to the United States. His work took him to Cuba, China, France, and Switzerland.

Jordan died in Prague in 1967 amidst unclear circumstances. Czechoslovak authorities stated that Jordan died by drowning in the Vltava River and alleged suicide. However, Czechoslovak defector Josef Frolík reported in 1974 that Jordan died in the Egyptian embassy's building in Prague, at the hands of Palestinian interrogators, after an abduction.

Jordan was posthumously awarded the Nansen Refugee Award in 1968.

Early life and early education 
Jordan was born in Philadelphia on February 7, 1908 to Jewish parents Hertha and R. Alfred Jordan. After the breakup of his parents, he moved to Berlin, Germany with his mother and sister, where he attended school. He was educated at the University of Berlin.

Adult life 
Jordan first job was with Orenstein & Koppel. While holidaying in Krummhübel (present day Karpacz, Poland) Jordan met the daughter of the guesthouse owner, Elizabeth Nemela, later marrying her in 1931. After being attacked her Nazi brother in 1933, the couple fled as refugees to Prague and lived in Dlouhá Street. In Prague, American embassy officials delayed Jordan's attempts to get an American passport for himself and a visa for his non-American wife. When he did return to the United States, Jordan attended Pennsylvania School of Social Work and the New York School of Social Work. He took employment with the Jewish Family Welfare Society of Philadelphia, the Philadelphia County Relief Board, the Jewish Social Service Association in New York City, the National Committee for the Resettlement of Foreign Physicians, and the National Refugee Service.

Jordan joined the American Jewish Joint Distribution Committee (JDC) in 1941, initially as the director of the Caribbean region, based at the organisation's regional headquarters in Havana, Cuba. As he helped Jews flee Nazi Germany for Cuba, the Office of Strategic Services (the predecessor to the US Central Intelligence Agency) suspected him of collaborating with the Nazis, believing that Nazis allowed Jewish refugees' escape in return for espionage activities.

From 1943 until 1945 Jordan served in the United States Navy before returning to work for the JDC, based in Shanghai. In 1948, he led the JDC's emigration department in Paris, helping Jewish refugees escape persecution in Eastern Europe. In 1950, he moved to Hungary, where he helped keep Jewish hospitals and soup kitchens operational, and supported Jewish refugees fleeing westwards. Jordan fled Hungary just as his local collaborators were arrested and accused of partaking in Zionist conspiracies.

During the 1950's Jordan helped create the Swiss organization Societé de Secours et d'Entreaide (English: "Relief and Mutual Aid Society") to provide a more official means to support Jewish refugees in Eastern Europe, and to enable communist countries avoid dealings with a Jewish organisation that they were in tension with.

In 1955, Jordan was appointed as the operations officer for JDC, and was appointed as the organisation's head in 1965, succeeding the recently deceased Moses A. Leavitt. He became the first senior leader of a Jewish organisation to travel to Arab countries, where he secretly negotiated on behalf of the minority Jewish communities. His travels took him to Egypt, Lebanon, and Syria.

In 1948, Jordan criticised the United Kingdom's immigration policy for favouring single people and prohibiting "Jews, Russians, Russian-Ukrainians, White Russians, and stateless Russians". Jordan also worked with the United Nations to support the needs of Burmese, Tibetan, Vietnamese, and Palestinian refugees. In 1967, he wrote to United Nations High Commissioner for Refugees calling for better support for Palestinian refugees.

Jordan was awarded the French Chevalier of the Legion of Honor in 1959, and received an award from the Norwegian Refugee Council in 1963. In June 1967, he was nominated by King Baudouin of Belgium as an Officer of the Order of Leopold II for his humanitarian work to support Belgian Jews.

Personal life and beliefs 
Jordan and his wife lived at 340 East 64th Street, New York. He was a Zionist.

Death, autopsy 

Jordan went missing on the evening of August 16, 1967 while on on holiday with his wife in Prague, during a stay at the Esplanade Hotel on Washington Street. His body was found by a rower on a weir between Střelecký Island and the Charles Bridge over the Vltava River on August 20, 1967. A Czechoslovak pathologist concluded that Jordan died by drowning, with no signs of trauma. The Czechoslovak government made a public statement that Jordan had taken his own life. In 2007, Czech newspaper Lidové noviny noted the Czechoslovak support for Arab states and the anti-Zionist campaign in communist states at the time, and critiqued the government for its production of misinformation and culture of secrecy.

At the request of the American government, physician Alexander Gonik and professor Ernest Hardmeyer, both from Switzerland, undertook a second autopsy several hours later, with the permission of the Czechoslovak authorities. Jordan's nephew Paul Kaplan identified Jordan's body based on clothing and his wedding ring. Jordan was 59 at the time of his death.

Post-death activities, 1967-8 

Jordan's employers, the American Jewish Joint Distribution Committee, had commonly been denounced in communist press as a "subversive Zionist agency". The New York Times reported his death as occurring in "mysterious circumstances". The American government twice asked Czechoslovak authorities for an official inquiry into Jordan's death.

Rabbi Alexandru Șafran spoke at a memorial for Jordan held in the Synagogue of Geneva on 16 September 1967.

On 17 November 1967, an anonymous tip was received that Jordan was assassinated by Arab students, but the letter was lost.

Jordan was posthumously awarded the Nansen Refugee Award on September 27, 1968.

Spy defection, 1974 
Czechoslovak defector Josef Frolík advised the Central Intelligence Agency in 1974 that Jordan had been abducted by Arab agents and died during interrogation by Palestinians at the Egyptian embassy in Prague. Frolík stated that Jordan was abducted outside the Esplanade Hotel. Frolik stated that Czechoslovak security services observed the abduction and were aware where Jordan was being held, but decided not to involve themselves in the matter.

2007 
In July 2007, the American Jewish Joint Distribution Committee requested United States Secretary of State Condoleeza Rice to re-open the investigation into Jordan's death.

References 

1908 births
1967 deaths
August 1967 events in Europe
Humboldt University of Berlin alumni
University of Pennsylvania School of Social Policy and Practice alumni
Columbia University School of Social Work alumni
American Zionists
People from Philadelphia
Jewish American social scientists
American emigrants to France
American emigrants to China
American refugees
Jewish refugees
American humanitarians
Nansen Refugee Award laureates